Colin Davis (1927–2013) was an English conductor.

Other people named Colin Davis include:
Colin Davis (racing driver) (1933–2012), English racing driver
Colin Davis (musician) (born 1974), American musician, audio engineer and record producer 
Colin Davis (philosopher), professor of French at Royal Holloway, University of London